A Handful Of Love is a TVB drama starring Joe Ma and Jessica Hsuan, this drama talks about an uncle taking care of his nephews/nieces because his sister and brother in law died. But the kids don't know that their parents are dead.

Cast 
Joe Ma (馬德鐘) - (Koo Ka Yuen (顧家源), a family man, Kuk Wai Ting's husband, the Fong kids' uncle)
Jessica Hsuan (宣萱) - (Kuk Wai Ting (谷慧庭), a director, Koo Ka Yuen's wife, the Fong kids' aunt, Laura)
Don Li (李逸朗) - (Fong Wing Yan (方穎仁), the big brother in the Fong kids, Koo Ka Yuen and Kuk Wai Ting's nephew)
Rachel Poon (潘曉彤) - (Fong Wing Yee (方穎儀), the older sister in the Fong kids (second oldest), Koo Ka Yuen and Kuk Wai Ting's niece)
Oscar Poon (潘 迪) - (Fong Wing Lai (方穎禮), the third oldest in the Fong kids, Koo Ka Yuen and Kuk Wai Ting's nephew)
Kevin Yau (丘梓宏) - (Fong Wing Chi (方穎智), the second youngest in the Fong kids, Koo Ka Yuen and Kuk Wai Ting's nephew)
Tiffany Tse (謝宛婷) - (Fong Wing Sun (方穎信), the youngest in the Fong kids, Koo Ka Yuen and Kuk Wai Ting's niece)
Mimi Lo (羅敏莊) - (Lo Yim Fun (羅艷芬), Fong Wing Lai and Fong Wing Chi's homeroom teacher)
Kiki Lam (林子萱) - (Liu Yan Yan (廖茵茵), Fong Wing Yan's girlfriend)
Johnson Lee (李思捷) - (Chu Kwok Leung (朱國亮), Koo Ka Yuen's best friend, a scriptwriter)

Show Motto 
The show's motto (mostly used in ads) is: "Contrary to popular belief, more than a handful is NOT a waste".

TVB dramas
2004 Hong Kong television series debuts
2004 Hong Kong television series endings